Eric Sorensen (born March 18, 1976) is an American meteorologist and politician serving as the U.S. representative from  since 2023. A member of the Democratic Party, Sorensen is the first openly gay member of Congress from Illinois.

Early life and career 
Born in Rockford, Illinois, Sorensen graduated from Boylan Catholic High School. He studied communications and meteorology at Northern Illinois University. 

Sorensen began his career as a meteorologist at KTRE, the ABC affiliate in Lufkin, Texas, from 1999 to 2000 before moving to Tyler, Texas, where he was the morning meteorologist for East Texas News Daybreak, which aired on both KLTV and KTRE-TV. He worked as chief meteorologist for WREX, Rockford's NBC affiliate, from 2003 to 2014, before becoming the senior meteorologist for WQAD, the ABC affiliate of Moline, Illinois. Sorensen became a fellow of the Society for Environmental Journalists in 2018. He retired from television in 2021. Sorensen took a job in communications for UnityPoint Health before announcing his run for Congress.

U.S. House of Representatives

2022 election 

He defeated Esther Joy King, the Republican nominee, in the November 8, 2022, general election.

Tenure

COVID-19 policy
On January 31, 2023, Sorenson voted against H.R.497:Freedom for Health Care Workers Act, a bill which would lift COVID-19 vaccine mandates for healthcare workers.

On February 1, 2023, Sorenson voted against a resolution to end COVID-19 national emergency.

Syria
In 2023, Sorenson voted against H.Con.Res. 21 which directed President Joe Biden to remove U.S. troops from Syria within 180 days.

Caucus memberships 

 New Democrat Coalition
 Congressional Equality Caucus (Co-chair)
 Heartland Caucus

Committee assignments 

 Committee on Science and Technology
 Committee on Agriculture

Personal life

Sorensen is the first LGBTQ person to be elected to Congress from Illinois. He lives with his partner in Moline.

References

External links 
Congressman Eric Sorensen official U.S. House website
 Eric Sorensen for Congress
 
 

|-

1976 births
21st-century LGBT people
American television meteorologists
Democratic Party members of the United States House of Representatives from Illinois
Gay politicians
Illinois Democrats
LGBT members of the United States Congress
LGBT people from Illinois
Living people
Northern Illinois University alumni
People from Moline, Illinois
Politicians from Rockford, Illinois